The England national football C team (previously known as the England National Game XI and the England Semi-Pro national team) is the football team that represents England at non-league level.

Formed in 1979 as the England Non-League team, it features players who play for clubs outside the Premier League and English Football League. Currently, the majority of selected players are full-time professionals with National League clubs.

Home matches are played at various League and non-league grounds around the country. Friendly matches are played with equivalent teams from other nations, and between 1979 and 2008, competed in the Four Nations Tournament each season, along with Scotland, Wales, and the full Gibraltar teams. In the tournament in 1980, held in Veenendaal, the opposition was Scotland (players outside the Premier Division, notably Ally McCoist, then playing for St Johnstone), Netherlands Amateurs and Italy under-21.
They have more recently begun playing against under-23 teams from the likes of Belgium and Turkey which have included players capped at full international level.

They won the Four Nations tournament for the seventh time in May 2008, winning all three of their matches without conceding a goal.
Since January 2003, the team has been managed by Paul Fairclough, who used to manage Barnet until he left the club by mutual consent in December 2008.

The team has played in three International Challenge Trophy finals.

Seasons

2022–23 results

2021–22 results

2019–20 results

2018–19 results

2017–18 results

2016–17 results

2015–16 results

2014–15 results

2013–14 results

2012–13 results

2011–12 results

2010–11 results

2009–10 results 

 † Team appeared as FA Representative XI.

2008–09 results

2007–08 results

2006–07 results

Players

Current squad 

The following squad was selected for a friendly fixture against Wales C on 21 March 2023.

Managers 
 Paul Fairclough (2003–)
 Steve Avory (2002–2003)
 John Owens (1997–2002)
 Keith Wright (1982–1985)
 Howard Wilkinson (1979–1982)

Notable players 
See: England semi-pro international footballers.

Honours 
 Four Nations Tournament (7): 1979, 1981, 1983, 2003, 2005, 2007, 2008
 European Challenge Trophy (1): 2006

See also 

 English football league system

References

External links 
 

C
European national semi-professional association football teams
1947 establishments in England